was a Japanese actor, voice actor and narrator.

Career 
Yamada left the faculty of literature of Waseda University, and had performed in many stage, radio, and television productions.

He appeared in performances of plays by Hisashi Inoue. His most famous role was Arsène Lupin III from the Lupin III series, starting in 1971 and ending in 1995. He was also the official Japanese dubbing voice actor of Clint Eastwood and Jean-Paul Belmondo. On March 19, 1995 Yasuo Yamada died of a brain hemorrhage at the age of 62. At the end of the credits of the film Farewell to Nostradamus (the first Lupin film without Yamada), there is a tribute: "To Yasuo Yamada, Eternal Lupin the Third: Thank you!" (the message was removed from the first angle of the English language DVD release by Funimation).

In the spring of 1993, Yamada was hospitalised for hypokalemia. From around this time, he became ill and was repeatedly hospitalised and discharged due to difficulty walking. More and more recordings in his later years were done sitting down.
At 3:30 pm on February 17, 1995, he collapsed at home due to a brain hemorrhage and was transferred to Tokyo Metropolitan Ebara Hospital. His family tended to him every day, but Yamada's condition suddenly worsened after they were withdrawn on the night of the 18th, and he died at 6:35 am on March 19. His remains were placed in Tama Cemetery.

Since Yamada's death, Kanichi Kurita has taken over the role of Arsène Lupin III.

Clint Eastwood 
Yamada was also the official Japanese dubbing voice actor of Clint Eastwood.

The beginning of it goes back to Rawhide, a career breakthrough Eastwood has long sought. Yamada dubbed Eastwood's Rudy Yates in this Western series. This was a huge success, and fans have come to call it "Eastwood's voice is Yamada," and its fame continues to this day. There were times when another person dubbed Eastwood, but most of the work was later redo dubbed by Yamada due to many protests from fans saying "Eastwood's voice is strange."

Yamada has often said in interviews since the 1970s. " Rawhide fitted naturally because I and Eastwood are young people. But after A Fistful of Dollars Eastwood became a masculine actor, but I became a shallow actor like a comedian. I don't think my Eastwood dubbing is the best right now." Also, Yamada's voice and Eastwood's voice are very different, but he said that this is a matter of habituation.

But there are episodes like this. When Yamada saw the script by a new translator when dubbing The Rookie, he immediately dismissed the script, saying, "This is not Eastwood's line!". also, In an interview, Yamada himself said, "Unlike other dubbings, I feel relieved when I see Eastwood on the screen during recording." "There is something different from likes and dislikes and characters."

Yamada and Eastwood met only once by the cast of Rawhide came to Japan in 1962. At this time, Yamada and Eastwood worked together for several days. Yamada talked about this memory in 1987. "He was a very good young man at that time, and he had a shy and naive atmosphere. At that time, I didn't think he would be a manly actor like he is now." In addition, Yamada carefully preserved  the autographed colored paper presented by Eastwood at this time as a "lifelong treasure". and said that the two had been Exchange letters for a while after returning to Japan.

After Yamada died at the end of the dubbing of A Perfect World, various people dubbed Eastwood, but none of them became popular and did not take root. But in 2009 that will change. There was a scene where Yamada was not dubbed in For a Few Dollars More, and Yōhei Tadano was dubbed as a substitute for Yamada in the DVD release. Tadano was a junior member of the theater company to which Yamada belonged, and his acting and voice were very similar to those of Yamada. After this, Tadano was dubbed in several works as a replacement for Yamada, and began dubbing Eastwood from The Mule. In an interview, Tadano said, "Eastwood's acting is important, but I acting with 100% respect for Mr. Yamada."

Filmography

Television animation
Big X (1964)
Ōgon Bat (1967)
Kamui the Ninja (1969) (Ikezu)
Andersen Monogatari (1971) (Zukko)
Lupin III (1971–72) (Arsène Lupin III)
Moonlight Mask (1972) (Akira Shinjo)
Hoshi no Ko Chobin (1974) (Usatan)
Tekkaman: The Space Knight (1975) (Andro Umeda)
Huckleberry no Bouken (1976) (Jim)
Lupin III Part II (1977–80) (Arsène Lupin III)
Botchan (1980) (Uranari)
Lupin III Part III (1984–85) (Arsène Lupin III)
Lupin III: Goodbye Lady Liberty (1989) (Arsène Lupin III)
Lupin III: Mystery of the Hemingway Papers! (1990) (Arsène Lupin III)
Lupin III: Steal Napoleon's Dictionary! (1991) (Arsène Lupin III)
Lupin III: From Russia With Love (1992) (Arsène Lupin III)
Lupin III: Voyage to Danger (1993) (Arsène Lupin III)
Lupin III: Dragon of Doom (1994) (Arsène Lupin III)

Theatrical animation
Panda! Go, Panda! (1972) (Omawari-san)
Lupin III: Mystery of Mamo (1978) (Arsène Lupin III)
Lupin III: The Castle of Cagliostro (1979) (Arsène Lupin III)
Dr. Slump: "Hoyoyo!" Space Adventure(1982) (Dr. Mashirito)
Lupin III: Legend of the Gold of Babylon (1985) (Arsène Lupin III)

Dubbing

Live-action
Clint Eastwood
Rawhide (Rowdy Yates)
A Fistful of Dollars (Joe)
Le streghe (Charlie)
The Good, the Bad and the Ugly (Blondie)
For a Few Dollars More (Manco)
Coogan's Bluff (Deputy Sheriff Walt Coogan)
Hang 'Em High (Deputy US Marshal Jed Cooper)
Where Eagles Dare (Lt. Morris Schaffer)
Paint Your Wagon (Pardner)
Kelly's Heroes (Private Kelly)
Two Mules for Sister Sara (Hogan)
The Beguiled (Corporal John 'McBee' McBurney)
Dirty Harry (Harry Callahan)
Play Misty for Me (Dave Garver)
Joe Kidd (Joe Kidd)
High Plains Drifter (The Stranger)
Magnum Force (Harry Callahan)
Thunderbolt and Lightfoot (Thunderbolt)
The Eiger Sanction (1978 Fuji TV edition) (Dr. Jonathan Hemlock)
The Enforcer (Harry Callahan)
The Outlaw Josey Wales (Josey Wales)
The Gauntlet (Detective Ben Shockley)
Every Which Way but Loose (Philo Beddoe)
Escape from Alcatraz (Frank Morris)
Any Which Way You Can (Philo Beddoe)
Bronco Billy (Bronco Billy)
Firefox (Mitchell Gant)
Sudden Impact (Harry Callahan)
City Heat (Lieutenant Speer)
Tightrope (Wes Block)
Pale Rider ("Preacher")
Heartbreak Ridge (Thomas Highway)
The Dead Pool (Harry Callahan)
Pink Cadillac (Tommy Nowak)
The Rookie (Nick Pulovski)
White Hunter Black Heart (John Wilson)
Unforgiven (William "Will" Munny)
In the Line of Fire (Agent Frank Horrigan)
A Perfect World (Chief Red Garnett)
Jean-Paul Belmondo
Two Women (Michele Di Libero)
A Man Named Rocca (Roberto La Rocca)
Cartouche (Louis-Dominique Bourguignon alias Cartouche)
That Man from Rio (Adrien Dufourquet)
Is Paris Burning? (Morandat/Pierrelot)
Casino Royale (French Legionnaire)
Love Is a Funny Thing (Henri)
Mississippi Mermaid (Louis Mahé)
Borsalino (François Capella)
The Married Couple of the Year (Two Nicolas Philibert)
Dr. Popaul (Dr. Paul Simay)
Le Magnifique (François Merlin / Bob Saint-Clar)
Stavisky (Serge Alexandre Stavisky)
Roddy McDowall
Planet of the Apes (Cornelius)
Beneath the Planet of the Apes (Cornelius)
Escape from the Planet of the Apes (Cornelius)
Easy Rider (Wyatt (Peter Fonda))
Monty Python (Graham Chapman)
Muppets (Kermit the Frog)
Combat! (PFC Paul "Caje" LeMay (Pierre Jalbert))
Force 10 from Navarone (1982 Fuji TV edition) (Staff Sergeant John Miller (Edward Fox))
The French Connection (Salvatore 'Sal' Boca (Tony Lo Bianco))
Race with the Devil (Roger Marsh (Peter Fonda))
Return of the Seven (Vin (Robert Fuller))
Strangers on a Train (Bruno Anthony (Robert Walker))

Animated
An American Tail: Fievel Goes West (Cat R. Waul)
The Fox and the Hound (Dinky the Sparrow)
Pinocchio (J. Worthington Foulfellow) (1983 dub)
One Hundred and One Dalmatians (Horace Badun)
Winnie the Pooh and the Honey Tree (Winnie the Pooh)The Rescuers (Bernard) (1981 dub)The Rescuers Down Under (Bernard)

Japanese Voice-OverPinocchio's Daring Journey (J. Worthington Foulfellow)Star Tours (Obi-Wan Kenobi)Country Bear Theater'' (Gomer)

Successors
Kanichi Kurita–Lupin III (Lupin III)
Nachi Nozawa–Umeda (Tatsunoko Fight) PS, (Clint Eastwood Japanese dub)
Toshio Kurosawa–Red-garnet Perfect Crime
Kiyoshi Kobayashi (Clint Eastwood Japanese dub)
Yōhei Tadano (Clint Eastwood, Dollars Trilogy)
Yoshito Yasuhara- Bernard (The Rescuers), Kermit (The Muppets)

References

External links 
Yasuo Yamada Bio at the Lupin Encyclopedia

1932 births
1995 deaths
Japanese male musical theatre actors
Japanese male video game actors
Japanese male voice actors
Lupin the Third
Male voice actors from Tokyo
20th-century Japanese male actors
20th-century Japanese male singers
20th-century Japanese singers